Fisher Run is a tributary of Catawissa Creek in Columbia County, Pennsylvania, in the United States. The stream is impaired by acid mine drainage. It is considered to be a high-quality coldwater fishery and Class A Wild Trout Waters.

Course

Fisher Run begins on Catawissa Mountain in southwestern Main Township. The stream flows east in a valley and crosses a road within a few tenths of a mile. A short distance later, it turns northeast for well over a mile. It eventually crosses Fisher Run Road and then Iron Bridge Road. Immediately after crossing Iron Bridge Road, the stream turns southeast and enters Beaver Township. In Beaver Township, the stream almost immediately reaches its confluence with Catawissa Creek.

Tributaries
Fisher Run has one unnamed tributary. It is known as "Trib 27549 To Fisher Run".

Hydrology
Fisher Run is considered to be impaired by acid mine drainage and metals. It is one of several streams and creeks in the watershed of Catawissa Creek with this impairment. The pH of the stream is between 6.0 and 6.9. The total concentration of alkalinity is 4 milligrams per liter.

Geography and geology

Most of the upper reaches of the watershed of Fisher Run are on rock of the Pocono Formation and most of the lower reaches are on rock of the Mauch Chunk Formation. However, the southern part of the watershed is on rock of the Spechty Kopf Formation and the Buddys Run Member of the Catskill Formation.

The main soils in the watershed of Fisher Run are the Leck Kill soil, the Hazleton soil, and the Watson soil.

Watershed, history, and etymology
Most of the watershed is in Main Township. However, substantial areas of it are in Catawissa Township and Roaring Creek Township. A small portion of the watershed is in Beaver Township.

The upper reaches and most of the rest of the watershed of Fisher Run are in Pennsylvania State Game Lands Number 58. However, the stream flows through agricultural land in its lower reaches.

Fisher Run is most likely named after Isaac Fisher.

Biology
The Pennsylvania Department of Environmental Protection considers Fisher Run to be a high-quality coldwater fishery. It is also considered by the Pennsylvania Fish and Boat Commission to be Class A Wild Trout Waters between its headwaters and its mouth. The stream is inhabited by brook trout, which also reproduce naturally throughout the stream.

See also
Scotch Run (Catawissa Creek), next tributary of Catawissa Creek going downstream
Mine Gap Run, next tributary of Catawissa Creek going upstream
List of tributaries of Catawissa Creek

References

External links
Map of the Catawissa Creek watershed 

Rivers of Columbia County, Pennsylvania
Tributaries of Catawissa Creek
Rivers of Pennsylvania